Samson Mountain is a mountain located in Sundown Wild Forest in the Catskill Mountains of New York. It stands above the Peekamoose Road (Ulster County Route 42) and the upper course of Rondout Creek.Van Wyck Mountain is located northwest and Bangle Hill is located west-southwest of Samson Mountain. The mountain was named for General Henry A. Samson, operator of a tannery in nearby Samsonville.

References

Mountains of Ulster County, New York
Mountains of New York (state)